12th Wing may refer to:

 CFB Shearwater (12 Wing Shearwater), a unit of the Canadian Air Force
 F 12 Kalmar, a unit of the Swedish Air Force
 12th Flying Training Wing, a unit of the United States Air Force

See also
 Twelfth Army (disambiguation)
 XII Corps (disambiguation)
 12th Division (disambiguation)
 12th Brigade (disambiguation)
 12th Regiment (disambiguation)
 12th Battalion (disambiguation)
 12 Squadron (disambiguation)